Pundo (Dzongkha: དཔུང་རྡོ་; Wylie: dpung-rdo; "strong-stone") is a traditional Bhutanese sport. It is a game played by laymen and consists of throwing a stone weighing over a kilo as far as possible. The throwing movement is from the shoulder, with the stone held flat in the hand.

See also
Sports in Bhutan

References

Sport in Bhutan
Sports originating in Bhutan